Vladimir Maltsev (born 20 April 1974, Makeyevka, Donetsk region) is the People's Deputy of Ukraine, member of the Party of Regions (since November 2007), a member of the Committee on Justice (December 2007).

Biography

Education
 2006 - graduated from Donetsk State Academy of management, qualified in Management of foreign economic activity
 2008 - qualified as a Master of Management of External Economic Activity
 2009 - graduated from Odessa National Law Academy qualified in jurisprudence, with a Master's degree of law

Career
 1992 - junior stope miner at Zhovtneva mine, Makeevugol community
 1993 - stope miner at Ordzhonikidze mine
 1993-1999 - worked at various enterprises ("NEC", PF "Codon", JSC "Alexandra", CJSC "Autoservis")
 1999 - сar mechanicn at JSC "Koksokhimoborudovanie"
 2004-2005 - employee at LLC "Embrol Ukraine LTD", JSC "Lux"
 December 2005 to May 2006 - Assistant to the General Director, JSC "Lux"

Politics
Member of the Party of Regions.
 May 2006 - November 2007 - People's Deputy of Ukraine of V convocation, member of the Verkhovna Rada Committee on Social Policy and Labour
 November 2007 - December 2012 - People's Deputy of Ukraine of VI convocation, member of the Committee on Justice
 from December 2012 - November 2014 - People's Deputy of Ukraine of VII convocation, member of the Committee on the law and justice

Maltsev did not participate in the 2014 Ukrainian parliamentary election.

References

1974 births
Living people
People from Makiivka
Odesa Law Academy alumni
Fifth convocation members of the Verkhovna Rada
Sixth convocation members of the Verkhovna Rada
Seventh convocation members of the Verkhovna Rada
Party of Regions politicians